Canal Sur Andalucía, formerly known as Andalucía Television shows the image of the Andalusia region of Spain to a global television audience via Canal Sur and Canal Sur 2.

Andalucía Televisión started broadcasting in February 1996. The Public Agency works for its thematic channels, programmes productions, corporate videos, advertising spots, documentaries, etc.

Television stations in Andalusia
Television channels and stations established in 1996